Horácio Carvalho de Macedo (born 15 February 1930) is a Portuguese rally driver.

Private life
Macedo, born in Porto, Portugal, the son of a land and sugar factory owner Mauricio Carvalho de Macedo who founded RAR - Refinarias de Açúcar Reunidas on the 20th of March of 1962 as the majority stakeholder. Through his mother, Almerinda Amélia Alves de Azevedo he is a noble descendant.
He developed an interest in cars and motor racing at an early age.

Rally racing
Horácio Carvalho de Macedo began his motor sport career with a Renault 4CV with which he won his first race, 1957 as National Champion followed by many others race wins. He then moved on to Chevrolet Corvette, Mercedes-Benz 300SL Gull wing  and Ferrari 250 GT. With the last two cars, he was the three time Portugal National Rally Champion. His Ferrari 250 GT SWB Berlinetta #2035GT is now in the Ralph Lauren car collection.

He accumulated a series of titles of which the most notable ones were as National Champion in 1957 and National Champion of Grande Turismo Especial in 1957, National Champion of Grande Turismo Especial in 1958, National Champion of Grande Turismo 1960, National Champion in 1961, National Champion of Grande Turismo in 1961, National Champion of Grande Turismo in 1962, National Champion in 1963, and National Champion of Grande Turismo in 1963.

He won several other championships which include the Rali Vinho da Madeira.

References

1930 births
Living people
Portuguese rally drivers
Auto racing people
Champ Car drivers
Portuguese racing drivers
Sportspeople from Porto